Ivanovca is a commune in Hînceşti District, Moldova. It is composed of three villages: Costești, Frasin and Ivanovca.

References

Communes of Hîncești District